Shigehiro (written: 重煕, 茂弘, 繁浩, 成浩 or 繁博) is a masculine Japanese given name. Notable people with the name include:

, Japanese military officer and spy
, Japanese daimyō
, Japanese film director and screenwriter
, Japanese basketball player
, Japanese swimmer

Shigehiro (written: 重廣) is also a Japanese surname. Notable people with the surname include:

, Japanese footballer

Japanese-language surnames
Japanese masculine given names